Joseph Philippe Payot (December 21, 1893 – April 29, 1958) was a French ice hockey player who competed in the 1924 Winter Olympics and in the 1928 Winter Olympics.

In 1924, he participated with the French ice hockey team in the Olympic tournament.

Four years later, he was also a member of the French team in the 1928 Olympic tournament.

External links
Philippe Payot's profile at Sports Reference.com

1893 births
1958 deaths
Chamonix HC players
Ice hockey players at the 1924 Winter Olympics
Ice hockey players at the 1928 Winter Olympics
Olympic ice hockey players of France
People from Chamonix
Sportspeople from Haute-Savoie